Samantha Mugatsia (born 1992) is a Kenyan actress.

Biography
Mugatsia was born in 1992, the daughter of Grace Gitau. She grew up in Nairobi and served as the drummer for the band The Yellow Machine. She had also done some modeling work. Mugatsia studied law at Catholic University of Eastern Africa, but put her studies on hold to begin her acting career. In November 2016, she was attending an artists' pop-in when she was introduced to film director Wanuri Kahiu, who told her she was writing a script and wanted to show Mugatsia. Even though she had never acted, Mugatsia accepted the role.

In 2018, Mugatsia played Kena Mwaura, one of the two leading characters, in Kahiu's Rafiki. The story is based on the novel Jambula Tree by the Ugandan writer Monica Arac de Nyeko and details the love that develops between two young women where homosexuality is forbidden. In order to prepare for the role, Mugatsia took several months of acting lessons and practiced using mirror exercises and mentally living in the character. The film was outlawed in Kenya, where homosexuality is illegal. Rafiki became the first Kenyan film to be screened at the Cannes Film Festival. Ann Hornaday of The Washington Post called Mugatsia's performance "quietly watchful." Mugatsia won the Best Actress award at the 2019 FESPACO festival in Ouagadougou, Burkina Faso for her portrayal of Kena. The ban on the film was briefly lifted after Kahiu filed a lawsuit, in order to be screened in Kenya to be eligible for the Academy Awards.

Mugatsia identifies as spiritual. She has refused to comment on her own sexuality, but is sympathetic to the LGBT community.

Filmography
2018: Rafiki as Kena Mwaura
2018: L'invité

References

External links
Samantha Mugatsia at the Internet Movie Database

1992 births
Living people
Kenyan film actresses
21st-century Kenyan actresses
People from Nairobi